Charbonneau is a ghost town in northwestern McKenzie County, North Dakota, United States.  It was abandoned when the post office was closed in the 1960s.

References

Ghost towns in North Dakota
Geography of McKenzie County, North Dakota